Saraswati is an Indian Marathi language television series which aired on Colors Marathi. The show starred Titeeksha Tawde and Astad Kale in lead roles. The series premiered from 28 December 2015 and ended on 12 May 2018.

Cast 
 Titeeksha Tawde as Saraswati
 Astad Kale as Raghav
 Sulekha Talwalkar as Aaisaheb
 Jui Gadkari as Devika
 Milind Shinde as Bhujang
 Sunil Barve
 Maadhav Deochake as Kanha
 Harish Dudhade as Ranjeet
 Sonal Pawar as Vandana
 Sangram Salvi as Sarjerao
 Shekhar Phadake
 Pooja Nayak
 Rasik Raj
 Yogesh Shirsat
 Siddheshwar Zadbuke

References

External links 
 
 Saraswati at Voot
 
2015 Indian television series debuts
Colors Marathi original programming
Marathi-language television shows
2018 Indian television series endings